Foster Creek is a stream in the U.S. state of South Dakota.

Some say Foster Creek has the name of E. W. Foster, an early settler, while others believe the creek has the name of James S. Foster, who was credited with bringing settlers into the area.

See also
List of rivers of South Dakota

References

Rivers of Beadle County, South Dakota
Rivers of Clark County, South Dakota
Rivers of Spink County, South Dakota
Rivers of South Dakota